Drosera darwinensis is a perennial carnivorous plant in the genus Drosera that is endemic to the Northern Territory. Its leaves are arranged in a rosette with one rosette emerging from the root stock. It produces pink or white flowers from December to April. Drosera darwinensis grows in clayey sand from Palmerston to Berry Springs south of Darwin and east to Humpty Doo. The specific epithet darwinensis refers to region where this plant is found in abundance. It is closely related to D. brevicornis, but differs from that species by its shorter inflorescence (5–15 cm long in D. darwinensis and 30–40 cm long in D. brevicornis).

See also 
 List of Drosera species
 Taxonomy of Drosera

References 

Carnivorous plants of Australia
Caryophyllales of Australia
Flora of the Northern Territory
Plants described in 1996
darwinensis